Itziar Gurrutxaga Bengoetxea is a Spanish former footballer who played as a central midfielder for Athletic Bilbao.

She earned 37 caps scored 3 goals for the Spain women's national football team from 1998 to 2008.

Honours 
Athletic Club
Superliga Femenina (4): 2002-03, 2003-04, 2004-05, 2006-07.

References

 

1977 births
Footballers from the Basque Country (autonomous community)
Living people
Spanish women's footballers
Primera División (women) players
Athletic Club Femenino players
People from Elgoibar
Women's association football midfielders